Pablo Larios Iwasaki (July 31, 1960 – January 31, 2019) was a Mexican professional footballer who played as a goalkeeper. He was nicknamed "El Arquero de la Selva" (The Goalkeeper of the Jungle), both for being from Zacatepec, a town in the Mexican state of Morelos known for his humid and warm climate, and for starting his career with his hometown's football club.

Career
Larios was a goalkeeper for Zacatepec, Cruz Azul, Puebla  and Toros Neza during his playing career. He played for the Mexico national football team at the 1986 FIFA World Cup, where Mexico reached the quarter-finals and 1991 CONCACAF Gold Cup. He also participated in the 1979 FIFA World Youth Championship.

He was the goalkeeper trainer in the 2006 FIFA World Cup working for Ricardo Lavolpe.

Personal life
He has Japanese ancestors on his maternal side.

In early September 2008, Larios's 19-year-old son, Pablo Larios Garza, was reported missing. After an intense search, he was found dead by the border police near the area of Grajeno, approximately 600 feet away from Rio Grande. He attempted to illegally cross the border to visit his girlfriend, who lived in the US, since he had lost his visa.

Death 
On Thursday January 31, 2019 Larios was pronounced dead at a hospital in Puebla.

Honours
Zacatepec
Mexican Segunda División: 1983–84

Puebla
Mexican Primera División: 1989–90
Copa México: 1989–90
Campeón de Campeones: 1989–90
CONCACAF Champions' Cup: 1991

See also
List of people from Morelos

References

External links

1960 births
2019 deaths
1986 FIFA World Cup players
1991 CONCACAF Gold Cup players
Association football goalkeepers
Mexican people of Japanese descent
Mexico international footballers
Mexico under-20 international footballers
Footballers from Morelos
Club Atlético Zacatepec players
Cruz Azul footballers
Club Puebla players
Toros Neza footballers
Liga MX players
Mexican footballers